Edward Barnes (born 26 November 1997) is an English cricketer who plays for Leicestershire. He also played for England at the Under-19 level. He made his first-class debut on 8 August 2020, for Derbyshire in the 2020 Bob Willis Trophy. He made his Twenty20 debut on 31 August 2020, for Derbyshire in the 2020 T20 Blast. He made his List A debut on 22 July 2021, for Leicestershire in the 2021 Royal London One-Day Cup. In April 2022, in the 2022 County Championship, Barnes took his maiden five-wicket haul in first-class cricket, with 5 for 101 against Derbyshire.

References

External links
 

1997 births
Living people
English cricketers
Yorkshire cricketers
Leicestershire cricketers
Cricketers from York